Barvish Kani (also Romanized as Barvīsh Kānī; also known as Baresh Kānī, Barvishkani Pahlavi Dezh, Berūshkānī, Berūyashkānī, Birvesh Kāni, and Dirvesh Kani) is a village in Nanur Rural District, Nanur District, Baneh County, Kurdistan Province, Iran. At the 2006 census, its population was 168, in 23 families. The village is populated by Kurds.

References 

Towns and villages in Baneh County
Kurdish settlements in Kurdistan Province